MDMA-assisted psychotherapy is the use of prescribed doses of MDMA as an adjunct to psychotherapy sessions. Research suggests that MDMA-assisted psychotherapy for post-traumatic stress disorder (PTSD), including Complex PTSD, might improve treatment effectiveness. In 2017, a Phase II clinical trial led to "breakthrough therapy" designation by the US Food and Drug Administration (FDA).

The research is controversial in part because recreational MDMA use has been associated with harmful effects among some users.

Post-traumatic stress disorder 
Post-traumatic stress disorder (PTSD) is most commonly treated by cognitive behavioral therapy (particularly prolonged exposure and cognitive processing therapy), eye movement desensitization and reprocessing, and psychodynamic psychotherapy. However, over half of these patients continue to have PTSD after completing therapy, with results from military PTSD being especially poor.

PTSD is best treated when a patient is in the 'optimal arousal zone'. This is the zone in which emotions are engaged, yet not overwhelming. In this zone, four symptom clusters of PTSD are sedated: These are:

re-experiencing
avoidance
negative alterations in cognition/mood
alterations in arousal and reactivity

Subjects with PTSD exhibit extreme emotional numbing or anxiety and struggle to remain in the optimal arousal zone during conservative therapies. Threatening interpretations of memories are reinforced when patients are in low emotional states. If traumatic memories are revisited in therapy when a patient is not within the optimal arousal state, therapy for PTSD can actually increase the patient's trauma.

When used in therapy MDMA has been reported to increase empathy, closeness between patient and therapist, relaxation, motivation to engage with therapy and introspective thought, and to reduce depression and anxiety. MDMA makes it easier for a patient to stay in the optimal arousal zone by decreasing feelings of anxiety and defensiveness when revisiting traumatic memories. It also increases feelings of closeness and empathy, improving the patient's trust in the therapist, and encourages introspective thought to reassess memories and actions. These factors may increase the success rate of psychotherapy. With the approval of the FDA  in 2017, MDMA has been cleared for the use in assisting with psychotherapy. A phase 3 study indicated that MDMA-assisted therapy represents a potential breakthrough treatment for severe PTSD that merits expedited clinical evaluation. However, given the lack of blinding, several researchers have postulated that the results of the phase 3 trial might be heavily influenced by expectancy effects, and there are no trials comparing MDMA-assisted psychotherapy to already existing first-line psychological treatments for PTSD, which based on indirect evidence seems to attain similar or elevated symptom reduction compared with that due to MDMA-assisted psychotherapy.

Adverse effects, which can last from a few hours to several days, include diminished appetite, anxiety, headache, jaw tightness, tinnitus, nausea, asthenia, fatigue, acute sinusitis, nasopharyngitis, upper respiratory tract infection, disturbance in attention, tremor, tics, dysuria, erythema, and depression.

Rationale for MDMA treatment 
PTSD inhibits a subject's ability to respond appropriately to trauma-related stimuli. The current model of PTSD proposes that it results from amplified and uncontrolled responses from the amygdala to trauma-specific cues. Oxytocin, which is increased by MDMA, has been found to increase trust and emotional awareness and reduce amygdala responses as well as reduce coupling of the amygdala to brainstem regions associated with autonomic and behavioral characteristics of fear. It has been proposed that these effects foster memory reconsolidation by allowing the patient to access the traumatic memory while feeling detached from the sense of imminent threat.

Breakthrough therapy designation 
In 2017, the treatment was granted breakthrough therapy designation by the FDA, a designation that indicates that there is preliminary evidence that an intervention might offer a substantial improvement over other options for a serious health condition.

Society and culture 
The use of psychedelics for therapy has been characterized as 'countercultural' in Western cultures.

Legality 
MDMA was first synthesized by German pharmaceutical company Merck KGaA in 1912 as an intermediate in the synthesis of another compound. Its psychoactive effects were not noted until the early 1960s. In the 1960s and 1970s, the drug was used in psychotherapy, although it was not an approved drug and no clinical trials had been performed. The drug was studied in Switzerland for use in individual, couple, and group therapies until 1993, when the Swiss Ministry of Health withdrew permission to use MDMA and LSD by psychiatrists due to concerns about lack of research methodology.

In 1986, MDMA was classed as a Schedule 1 drug by the United Nations according to its Convention on Psychotropic Substances of 1971 due to its high potential for abuse, and most research was stopped. Researchers interested in MDMA for use in psychotherapy founded and funded the Multidisciplinary Association for Psychedelic Studies (MAPS) in response. The US Food and Drug Administration (FDA) and Drug Enforcement Administration (DEA) granted approval for researching MDMA's efficacy as an adjunct to psychotherapy in 2004, and the first trial was carried out in 2011.

Controversy 
MDMA's effects vary across people and settings and include adverse outcomes. The drug causes neurotransmitter activation across the main neural pathways (including serotonin and dopamine, noradrenaline) that can result in large mood swings. The memories that emerge under the influence of MDMA can evoke unwanted emotions. Side effects of MDMA use by recreational users include appetite fluctuations, food cravings, and disordered eating.

Once the effects of MDMA wear off, there is a "period of neurochemical depletion" that invokes anhedonia, lethargy, anger, depression, irritability, brooding, greater everyday stress, altered pain thresholds, changes in sleep, and bad dreams, especially in female participants. The symptoms are thought to be due to depletion of serotonin, as a result of the large release of serotonin triggered by MDMA, and have been called "neurotoxic in terms of causing serotonergic dysfunction".

There are also concerns surrounding "drug-dependent learning" — the theory that patients will return to the drug to access the state they were in when on the drug in therapy.

There were 92 MDMA related deaths in England and Wales in 2018, up from 56 the year before, and 10,000 hospitalizations for MDMA related illness/injury in 2011 in the US. However no such cases have (as of 2021) been reported for clinical settings.

Media reports and statements of academic authors have often transmitted the view of MDMA as a possible medicine or treatment rather than as an adjunct to psychotherapy. This has been considered as dangerous, because it could lead people to believe that MDMA is an effective treatment alone, without concomitant psychotherapy.

See also 
 Improving Access to Psychological Therapies 
 Convention on Psychotropic Substances
 List of Psychotherapies

References

External links 
 MDMA Facts and Statistics National Institute on Drug Abuse
 Methylenedioxymethamphetamine (MDMA or 'Ecstasy') drug profile European Monitoring Centre for Drugs and Drug Addiction
 MDMA-Assisted Psychotherapy Multidisciplinary Association for Psychedelic Studies
 Dead Dog on the Left Documentary about MDMA-assisted treatment for military PTSD
 Is MDMA psychiatry's antibiotic? Tedx Talk by Ben Sessa.
 MDMA, Psychotherapy, and the Future of PTSD Treatment TEDx talk by Brad Burge

Psychotherapy, MDMA-assisted
Psychotherapy